Macedonians in Hungary (in) refers to the ethnic Macedonian minority residing in today's Republic of Hungary. After the Greek Civil War, many Macedonians were evacuated to Hungary. Many left from the Socialist Republic of Macedonia in the 1950s and 1960s. A substantial minority remained of the 7,253 who fled Greece. An estimated 5,000 Macedonians lived in Hungary in 1995. Most of the Macedonian population is present in the country's capital - Budapest.

References

See also 
Macedonians
Macedonian language
Republic of North Macedonia

Hungary